California Proposition 90 may refer to:

 California Proposition 90 (1988) 
 California Proposition 90 (2006)